Inside Men is a 2015 South Korean political crime-action film written and directed by Woo Min-ho based on Yoon Tae-ho's webtoon The Insiders that dissects the corruption within Korean society. Starring Lee Byung-hun, Cho Seung-woo and Baek Yoon-sik, it began filming in July 2014 and was released in theaters on November 19, 2015.

Inside Men and the director's cut Inside Men: The Original have sold a total of 9.1 million admissions at the box office, thus becoming the top grossing R-rated movie of all-time at the Korean Box office.

Plot
Lee Kang-hee, an editor at an influential conservative newspaper, raises congressman Jang Pil-woo to the position of leading Presidential candidate using the power of the press; behind this is his secret deal with the paper's biggest sponsor.

Ahn Sang-goo, a political henchman who supported Lee and Jang, gets caught pocketing the record of the sponsor's slush fund, resulting in a dismembered hand. Woo Jang-hoon, an ambitious prosecutor, starts to investigate the relationship between Jang and the sponsor, believing that it's his only chance to make it to the top. While getting down to the brass tacks of the case, Woo meets Ahn, who has been methodically planning his revenge. Now the war between the one blinded with power, the one hell-bent on vengeance, and the one eager for success begins.

Cast
Lee Byung-hun as Ahn Sang-goo
Cho Seung-woo as Woo Jang-hoon
Baek Yoon-sik as Lee Kang-hee
Lee Geung-young as Jang Pil- woo
Kim Hong-pa as Oh Hyun-soo
Bae Seong-woo as Park Jong-pal
Jo Jae-yoon as Section chief Bang
Kim Dae-myung as Go Sang-chul
Jo Woo-jin as Managing director Jo
Lee El as Joo Eun-hye
Jung Man-sik as Choi Choong-sik, Chief prosecutor in Seoul Central District Prosecutor's Office
Kim Byeong-ok as Oh Myung-hwan, Secretary for civil affairs in the Blue House
Kim Eui-sung as Editor-in-chief in Joguk Ilbo
Park Jin-woo as Department head Lee 
Nam Il-woo as Woo Jang-hoon's father 
Kwon Hyeok-poong as Seok Myeong-gwan 
Ryu Tae-ho as Moon Il-seok 
Park Sang-gyoo as Kim Seok-woo 
Kwon Tae-won as Song Man-seob, Sponsorship chairman Jang Pil-woo 
Jo Deok-je as Detective Choi 
Park Jin-young as Member of parliament Son

Reception
On its first four days at the South Korean box office, the film grossed . Inside Men drew more than 2 million viewers in just six days, a record for an R-rated film; it has also set the record for the most-viewed R-rated movie in a single day—489,503 viewers.

Awards and nominations

References

External links

South Korean crime thriller films
South Korean films about revenge
Films about journalism
Films based on South Korean webtoons
2015 crime thriller films
South Korean crime action films
2015 crime action films
South Korean political films
Political thriller films
Films directed by Woo Min-ho
Live-action films based on comics
Political action films
2010s South Korean films